Borovnice may refer to places in the Czech Republic:
 
Borovnice (Benešov District), a municipality and village in the Central Bohemian Region
Borovnice (České Budějovice District), a municipality and village in the South Bohemian Region
Borovnice (Rychnov nad Kněžnou District), a municipality and village in the Hradec Králové Region
Borovnice (Trutnov District), a municipality and village in the Hradec Králové Region
Borovnice (Žďár nad Sázavou District), a municipality and village in the Vysočina Region